Ugo Gobbato (Volpago del Montello, 16 July 1888 – Milan, 28 April 1945) was an Italian engineer and Managing Director of Alfa Romeo  1933 to 1945.

He studied in Germany where he graduated in mechanical engineering at the Technical University of Zwickau in Saxony.  After having fulfilled his military service between 1915 and 1918, he was hired to Fiat becoming the first director of the Lingotto factory. From 1929 to 1931, followed by the construction Fiat factories in Germany and Spain and again in 1931, by direct appointment of Fiat founder and senator Giovanni Agnelli (1866–1945), he was entrusted with the construction of the factory in Moscow, a city where he lived for over two years.

He was back in Italy in 1933, and the government and the Istituto per la Ricostruzione Industriale (IRI) gave him the task of reorganizing Alfa Romeo which was facing bankruptcy. From 1938 he directed the development of a new factory in Alfa Romeo Pomigliano d'Arco plant outside Naples, bombed in 1943. Back in Milan, he led the company until he was assassinated in Milan on 28 April 1945, immediately after the war.  He was followed as Alfa director by Pasquale Gallo (1887–1982).

Ugo married in 1916 to Dianella and was the father of racing driver Pier Ugo Gobbato (1918–2008).

References

Literature 
Marino Parolin, Ugo Gobbato - La leggenda di un innovatore senza epoca, Volpago del Montello, 2009 (see gobbatougo.it, the book's homepage)

20th-century Italian businesspeople
Italian automotive pioneers
Alfa Romeo people
1888 births
1945 deaths
Assassinated Italian people
People murdered in Italy
Male murder victims